Slonimsky is an Ashkenazi Jewish surname popular among people of Belarusian, Polish and Russian people of Jewish origin. It means "a person from the city of Slonim". 

Persons with this surname include the following:
Antoni Słonimski: Polish poet
Piotr Słonimski: Polish-French geneticist
Hayyim Selig Slonimski: Hebrew publisher, astronomer, inventor, and science author (known as Zinovy Slonimsky in Russia)
Lee Slonimsky: American poet
Ludvig Slonimsky: Russian economist, journalist and editor, son of Hayyim Selig (Zinovy) Slonimski
Mikhail Slonimsky: Soviet writer; younger brother of Nicolas Slonimsky
Nicolas Slonimsky: Russian-American musicologist and music critic
Sergei Slonimsky: Russian composer, son of Mikhail Slonimsky

Yuri Slonimsky (1902-1978), dancer, choreographer, historian, head of Leningrad State Institute of Theatre, Music, and Cinema after WWII
A surname with a similar meaning is Slonim:
Anthony Slonim: American author, physician and healthcare executive
Mark Slonim: Russian politician, literary critic, scholar and translator
Reuben Slonim: Canadian rabbi and journalist
Vered Slonim-Nevo: professor of social work at the Spitzer Department of Social Work in Ben-Gurion University of the Negev 
Menucha Rochel Slonim: rebbetzin
Véra Nabokov (née Slonim): wife, editor, and translator of Russian writer Vladimir Nabokov

See also
Slonim (Hasidic dynasty)
Slonimsky's Earbox

Jewish surnames
Slonim